Crossroads is an unincorporated community in Baldwin County, Alabama, United States.

History
The community is named due to the fact it is located at a crossroads.

References

Unincorporated communities in Baldwin County, Alabama
Unincorporated communities in Alabama